Ye Tun Naung (born 26 May 1983 in Minhla) is a Burmese sport shooter who competes in pistol events. In 2014 he represented Myanmar in 2014 Asian Games. In 2015 he won silver in 3rd World Cup stage and secured quota for Myanmar in 2016 Summer Olympics.

References

External links
 
ISSF profile

Burmese male sport shooters
1983 births
Living people
People from Bago Region
Shooters at the 2014 Asian Games
Shooters at the 2018 Asian Games
Olympic shooters of Myanmar
Shooters at the 2016 Summer Olympics
Shooters at the 2020 Summer Olympics
Southeast Asian Games medalists in shooting
Southeast Asian Games silver medalists for Myanmar
Competitors at the 2013 Southeast Asian Games
Asian Games competitors for Myanmar